Taylor Pendrith (born May 30, 1991) is a Canadian professional golfer who plays on the PGA Tour. He won twice on PGA Tour Canada in 2019.

Amateur career
Pendrith attended Kent State University from 2010 to 2014. He made the cut in the 2014 Canadian Open and was the low amateur. He was part of the Canadian team that finished second, behind the United States, in the 2014 Eisenhower Trophy.

Professional career
Pendrith turned professional in late 2014, after the Eisenhower Trophy. In 2015 he played mostly on PGA Tour Canada. He was runner-up three times and finished third in the Order of Merit to earn a place on the Web.com Tour. He finished tied for fourth place in the Club Colombia Championship, his second event on the 2016 Web.com Tour, but this was his only top-10 finish of the season and he missed the cut 14 times.

Pendrith played primarily on the Canadian Tour from 2017 to 2019. He had little success in 2017 and 2018, but in 2019 he was runner-up in the Osprey Valley Open and then won the 1932byBateman Open and Mackenzie Investments Open to finish second in the Order of Merit and earn a place on the Korn Ferry Tour. Playing on the 2020 Korn Ferry Tour, Pendrith was runner-up in three consecutive tournaments in July and runner-up again in the Wichita Open in September. His performances on the Korn Ferry Tour earned him a place at the 2020 U.S. Open where he finished tied for 23rd place after a final round of 70.

Pendrith earned a promotion to the PGA Tour from the Korn Ferry Tour at the conclusion of the 2020–21 season.

In July 2022, Pendrith had his best finish to date on the PGA Tour with a T2 at the 2022 Rocket Mortgage Classic.

In September 2022, Pendrith was selected for the International team in the 2022 Presidents Cup; he lost all four of the matches he played.

Amateur wins
2013 Porter Cup, Mid-American Conference Championship
2014 Monroe Invitational

Source:

Professional wins (2)

PGA Tour Canada wins (2)

Results in major championships
Results not in chronological order in 2020.

CUT = missed the half-way cut
"T" = tied
NT = No tournament due to COVID-19 pandemic

Results in The Players Championship

"T" indicates a tie for a place

Team appearances
Amateur
Eisenhower Trophy (representing Canada): 2014

Professional
Presidents Cup (representing the International team): 2022

See also
2021 Korn Ferry Tour Finals graduates

References

External links

Canadian male golfers
PGA Tour golfers
Kent State Golden Flashes men's golfers
Sportspeople from Richmond Hill, Ontario
1991 births
Living people